Robert T. Bartley (May 20, 1909 – January 8, 1988) was an American administrator who served as a Commissioner of the Federal Communications Commission from 1952 to 1972.

He died on January 8, 1988, in Washington, D.C. at age 78.

References

1909 births
1988 deaths
Members of the Federal Communications Commission
Texas Democrats
Truman administration personnel
Eisenhower administration personnel
Kennedy administration personnel
Lyndon B. Johnson administration personnel
Nixon administration personnel